The 2005 Women's National Invitation Tournament was a single-elimination tournament of 32 NCAA Division I teams that were not selected to participate in the 2005 Women's NCAA tournament. It was the eighth edition of the postseason Women's National Invitation Tournament.

The final four of the tournament paired Missouri State against Iowa and West Virginia against Kentucky. Missouri State upended Iowa 89–80. Meanwhile, West Virginia and Kentucky played a double overtime thriller, which ended up with West Virginia winning 80–75.

The final pitted Missouri State and West Virginia against each other in Springfield, Missouri, as the Lady Bears hosted at the Hammons Student Center. The game was another close one for both teams, with Missouri State ultimately pulling out the victory for their 1st WNIT Championship, 78–70.

Bracket

Region 1
*Host • Source

Region 2
*Host • Source

Region 3
*Host • Source

Region 4
*Host • Source

Semifinals and championship game

All-tournament team
 Jenny Lingor, Missouri State (MVP)
 Kari Koch, Missouri State
 Yolanda Paige, West Virginia
 Meg Bulger, West Virginia
 Crystal Smith, Iowa
 Sara Potts, Kentucky
Source:

See also
 2005 NCAA Division I men's basketball tournament
 2005 NCAA Division I women's basketball tournament
 2005 National Invitation Tournament

References

Women's National Invitation Tournament
Women's National Invitation Tournament
Women's National Invitation Tournament